The flag of the Commonwealth of the Northern Mariana Islands was adopted in July 1985, by the Second Northern Marianas Constitution.
The NMI flag was originally designed by Taga during the year 1985. Later during that year, they finalized the draft of the flag in the last CNMI constitutional convention. This was the most symbolic moment of the annexation of the CNMI. 

The flag consists of three symbols: a star representing the United States, a latte stone representing the Chamorros, and a mwarmwar (decorative wreath) representing the Carolinians; the blue background represents the Pacific Ocean and the Mariana Trench.

Historical flags

See also
Seal of the Northern Mariana Islands
Flags of the U.S. states
Northern Mariana Islands

References

Flags introduced in 1985
Flags of the insular areas of the United States
Flag
1985 establishments in the Northern Mariana Islands
Northern